The Church of St James is an Anglican parish church in Southstoke, Somerset, England. It was built in the 12th century and has been designated as a Grade II* listed building.

Dedicated to James, son of Zebedee, known in England as St James the Great, the original 12th-century building was altered in the 15th century. Further restoration was undertaken in the 1840s and 1850s when the chancel and south aisle were rebuilt. However, the north door is Norman. Pevsner says of it 

Pevsner also noted in the 1950s that the church plate included an Elizabethan chalice and a paten by Thomas Parr marked for the year 1700.

The parish is part of the benefice of Combe Down with Monkton Combe and South Stoke within the archdeaconry of Bath.

See also
 List of ecclesiastical parishes in the Diocese of Bath and Wells

References

Church of England church buildings in Bath and North East Somerset
12th-century church buildings in England
Grade II* listed churches in Somerset
Grade II* listed buildings in Bath and North East Somerset
Combe Down